The wrinkled miner bee (Andrena rugosa) is a species of miner bee in the family Andrenidae. Another common name for this species is the rugose andrena. It is found in North America.

References

Further reading

 
 

rugosa
Articles created by Qbugbot
Insects described in 1891